De Bie is a surname of Dutch origin. "De bie" (modern spelling "de bij") means "the bee", and the surname can be of metonymic occupational origin, e.g. a paternal ancestor may have been a bee-keeper. Other origins could be an address ("from a house with a sign of a bee") or be metaphorical (e.g. a busy person). Variant spellings include De Bij, De Bije, De By, De Bye, DeBie, Debije and Debye.

People with this name include:
 De Bie
Adriaen de Bie (1593–1668), Flemish painter
Amadeus de Bie (1844–1920), Belgian abbot
Cornelis de Bie (1621–1664), Dutch landscape painter
Cornelis de Bie (1627–1715), Flemish  rhetorician, poet, and jurist
Danny De Bie (born 1960), Belgian cyclocross racer
Erasmus de Bie (1629–1675), Flemish land- and cityscape painter 
Erik Scott de Bie (born 1983), American fantasy author
Jan de Bie (1946–2021), Dutch painter and photographer
Jean de Bie (1892–1961), Belgian football goalkeeper
Mark De Bie (born 1939), Belgian television writer
René De Bie (born 1945), Belgian racing cyclist
Sean De Bie (born 1991), Belgian racing cyclist
Silvy De Bie (born 1981), Belgian dance vocalist
Thomas De Bie (born 1991), Belgian football goalkeeper
Wim de Bie (born 1939), Dutch comedian (half of the Dutch comedy duo "Van Kooten en De Bie")
Wouly de Bie (born 1958), Dutch water polo player
DeBie/ Debie
Benoît Debie (born 1968), Belgian cinematographer
De Bij/ De By
Herman de By (1873–1961), Dutch swimmer
De Bije/ De Bye
Marcus de Bye (1638/39–aft.1688), Dutch painter and engraver
Debije / Debye
Peter Debye (1884–1966), Dutch physicist and Nobel-laureate

References

Dutch-language surnames
Occupational surnames